On November 4, 1836, a special election was held in  to fill a vacancy left by the October 30th, 1836 resignation of Jesse Miller (J).

Election results

Black took his seat December 5, 1836, at the start of the 2nd session of the 24th Congress.

See also
List of special elections to the United States House of Representatives

References

Pennsylvania 1836 13
Pennsylvania 1836 13
1836 13
Pennsylvania 13
United States House of Representatives 13
United States House of Representatives 1836 13
November 1836 events